Shifting Sands can refer to:

The Shifting Sands, a book in the Deltora Quest series
Shifting Sands (1918 film), a 1918 film
Shifting Sands (1922 film), a 1922 film
Shifting Sands, a 1957 episode of The Goon Show
Forms of equivocation, a logical fallacy